Abdul Ghapur Salleh (born 21 March 1943) is a Malaysian politician. He was the former Member of the Parliament of Malaysia for the Kalabakan constituency in Sabah, representing the United Malays National Organisation (UMNO) in the governing Barisan Nasional (BN) coalition from 2004 to May 2018.

Before entering federal politics, Abdul Ghapur was active in Sabah state politics, initially as a member of the Sabah People's United Front (commonly known as BERJAYA). He joined UMNO when it moved into the state in the early 1990s and was a Deputy Chief Minister in the Barisan Nasional state government between 1995 and 1997.

Political career 
He was elected unopposed to federal Parliament in 2004, for the newly created seat of Kalabakan on the border between Malaysia and Indonesia in East Sabah. In 2008, after his re-election (again unopposed), he was appointed as a Deputy Minister for Resources and Natural Environment by Prime Minister Abdullah Badawi, only to resign eight days later. Later that year he openly criticised the BN government in Parliament for overlooking the needs states of Sabah and Sarawak, which had voted resoundingly in favour of BN in the 2008 election. He again spoke out against the federal government for what he considered to be its slow response to the invasion of part of eastern Sabah by Filipino militants in 2013. At the same time, he criticsed UMNO's internal election process as being open to corruption, claiming that "people will do anything just to get on the Supreme Council even if it’s very expensive".

Election results

Honours
  :
  Commander of the Order of Kinabalu (PGDK) – Datuk (1994)
  Grand Commander of the Order of Kinabalu (SPDK) – Datuk Seri Panglima (2005)

References 

Living people
1943 births
Members of the Dewan Rakyat
Grand Commanders of the Order of Kinabalu
Commanders of the Order of Kinabalu
Members of the Sabah State Legislative Assembly
Former United Malays National Organisation politicians
People from Sabah
Malaysian Muslims